Winfield Scott Mattraw (October 19, 1880 – November 9, 1946) was an American film and television actor.  He provided the voice of Bashful in Walt Disney's Snow White and the Seven Dwarfs.

The son of William Henry and Philamon Dano Mattraw, Winfield Scott Mattraw was born in Black River, New York, on October 19, 1880. His father farmed and worked for the New York Air Brake company. Mattraw was educated in Black River schools. His early employment included driving for American Express Company.

Career 
Mattraw was already a comedian and a theatrical promoter and manager when, at age 27, he became manager of the City Opera House in Watertown, New York. He held that job for 12 years. He left his position with the opera house after it was sold, with the new owners planning to convert the theater into a venue for films. He started Scotty's Eatable Eats in February 1920, but financial problems led to its closing by the summer of 1922. He started a coffee shop and confectionery in December 1922, but it went out of business in less than four months.

Mattraw went to Hollywood in 1923 to begin working in films. One of his early film efforts was portraying the sheriff in a Western comedy in 1923. Later that year he had a lead comedy role in The Thief of Bagdad for the Douglas Fairbanks Picture Company.

Personal life and death 
Mattraw married Edna Hunter on June 25, 1903. They had a son and two daughters. The house he owned in Watertown was sold in July 1925 under a mortgage foreclosure judgment, and financial problems led to his filing a petition for bankruptcy in Los Angeles in the fall of 1926. He died on November 9, 1946, at his home in Hollywood.

Partial filmography

 Le Voleur de Bagdad (1924) - Eunuch (uncredited)
 The Lucky Lady (1926) (uncredited)
 The Red Mill (1927) - Cook (uncredited)
 The Return of the Riddle Rider (1927) - Willie
 The Border Cavalier (1927)
 A Made-To-Order Hero (1927) - Scotty
 One Glorious Scrap (1927) - Scotty
 Two Lovers (1928) - Dandermonde Innkeeper
 Haunted Island (1928) 
 The Arizona Cyclone (1928) - Scotty
 Quick Triggers (1928) - Scotty
 Captain Cowboy (1929)
 The Merry Frinks (1934) - Fat Man (uncredited)
 One More River (1934) - Juryman (uncredited)
 Babes in Toyland (1934) - Town Crier (uncredited)
 Okay Toots! (1935) - Mr. Jones - Fat Man at Party (uncredited)
 George White's 1935 Scandals (1935) - Fat Man (uncredited)
 Escapade (1935) - Cab Driver (uncredited)
 Private Number (1936) - Houseman (uncredited)
 Under Your Spell (1936) - Sponsor (uncredited)
 Wee Willie Winkie (1937) - Merchant (uncredited)
 Snow White and the Seven Dwarfs (1937) - Bashful (voice, uncredited)
 In Old Chicago (1937) - Beef King
 The Grapes of Wrath (1940) - Migrant (uncredited)
 One Hour in Wonderland (1950) - (voice)

References

External links
 
  
 

1880 births
1946 deaths
American male voice actors
American male film actors
20th-century American male actors